Upaga is a village in Puncak Regency, Central Papua province, Indonesia. Its population is 2289

Climate
Although Upaga is located on tropical latitudes, the very high elevation causes its Climate to be classified as Subpolar oceanic (Cfc) with cold temperatures and very heavy rainfall year-round.

References

Villages in Central Papua